A list of Italian politicians by party:

List of Alleanza Nazionale politicians 
List of Italian Communist Party politicians
List of Italian Communist Refoundation Party politicians
List of Partito d'Azione politicians 
List of Democrats of the Left politicians
 List of Democratic Party of Italy politicians 
List of Italian Christian Democracy politicians
List of Lega Nord politicians
List of Italian Liberal Party politicians
List of Italian Social Movement politicians
 List of Democracy is Freedom – The Daisy politicians

See also
List of Italians#Politicians

 
Lists of Italian politicians